Marine Corps Air Station Tustin (IATA: NTK, ICAO: KNTK, FAA LID: NTK) is a former United States Navy and United States Marine Corps air station, located in Tustin, California.

History 

The Air Station was established in 1942 by the United States Navy as a lighter-than-air base, officially known as Naval Air Station Santa Ana. The base was designed for blimp operations in support of the Navy's coastal patrol efforts during World War II. It was commissioned on 1 October 1942 by its commandant, Capt. Howard N. Coulter. As of July 1947, the facility, under command of Capt. Benjamin May, had personnel consisting of 100 officers, 500 enlisted men and 180 civilian employees. NAS Santa Ana was decommissioned in 1949. In 1951, the facility was reactivated as Marine Corps Air Facility Santa Ana to support the Korean War. It was the country's first air facility developed solely for helicopter operations. It was named "Marine Corps Air Station, Santa Ana" in 1966 and renamed Marine Corps Air Station Tustin in 1979.

During the Vietnam War, the base was a center for on-going testing of radar installations (including the Sperry TPS-34) which were erected, tested, disassembled and shipped to South Vietnam. It also was a training facility for helicopter pilots.

By the early 1990s, MCAS Tustin was a major center for Marine Corps helicopter aviation and radar on the Pacific Coast. Its primary purpose was to provide support services and material for the 3rd Marine Aircraft Wing and for other units utilizing the base. About 4,500 residents once lived on the base, and the base employed nearly 5,000 military personnel and civilians. In addition to providing military support, MCAS Tustin leased  to farmers for commercial crop development. For many years, agricultural lands surrounded the facility. However beginning in the 1980s residential and light industrial/manufacturing areas developed adjacent to the station.

In 1991 and again in 1993, under the authority of the Base Realignment and Closure Act of 1990, it was announced that MCAS Tustin would be closed. Operational closure of the base occurred in July 1999. However, the north hangar is still used as a storage and repair center for commercial blimps. The remaining  will be conveyed to other federal agencies, the City of Tustin and public institutions for the same uses once environmental clean-up operations have been concluded. The site of the base is now the home of the academy of the Orange County Sheriff's Department. Much of the former base has become residential housing.

The large blimp hangars have been used for location shooting for numerous movies and TV programs, including JAG and The X-Files. In 1993, the blimp hangars were designated a National Civil Engineering Landmark by the American Society of Civil Engineers (ASCE). There have been talks regarding making one of the hangars a military museum.

The base was featured in Visiting... with Huell Howser Episode 1509.

Worldwide Aeros Corp utilized one of the historic hangars to build a prototype cargo airship under contract from the Pentagon and NASA. In October, 2013, part of the roof collapsed, damaging the airship prototype.

Future 

Plans are in the works to convert  of the former base into a regional park, originally scheduled to be opened in 2016. In the summer of 2013, OC Parks was in the process of gathering input from the community in order to determine the features and layout of the forthcoming facilities.

Although the preservation of the hangars is one of the greatest concerns raised in surveys taken by OC Parks, the fate of the south hangar is uncertain.

The City of Tustin has reportedly met with officials from the Los Angeles Angels of Anaheim, proposing the former air base as a potential site for a new stadium for the team, whose lease with the City of Anaheim's Angel Stadium allowed the team to opt out between 2016 and 2019.

In 2016, Orange County and the South Orange County Community College District arranged for a land swap of ten acres to be used to replace the aging Orange County Animal Shelter in nearby Orange. In July 2016, a ground-breaking ceremony was held.

See also 

 List of United States Marine Corps installations
 Hangar One (Mountain View, California)
 Tillamook Air Museum

References

Notes

Bibliography

External links 

 OC Parks
 Base Realignment and Closure Project Management Office
 Marine Corps Air Station, Tustin at The California State Military Museum
 Info from globalsecurity.org
 Info from Paul Freeman's Abandoned & Little-Known Airfields
 Photos of the Air Station at the Tustin Historical Society website
 History of base provided by US Navy
 http://ocparks.com/about/projects/tbh

Buildings and structures in Orange County, California
Transportation buildings and structures in Orange County, California
Tustin, California
Tustin
Formerly Used Defense Sites in California
Defunct airports in California
World War II airfields in the United States
History of Orange County, California
Military facilities in Greater Los Angeles
National Register of Historic Places in Orange County, California
World War II on the National Register of Historic Places in California
Historic Civil Engineering Landmarks
1942 establishments in California
1999 disestablishments in California
Military airbases established in 1942
Military installations closed in 1999
Closed installations of the United States Navy